The Sileti is a river in Kazakhstan.

The Sileti river system is an endorheic watershed in the Akmola, Pavlodar and North Kazakhstan regions of Kazakhstan.

Course 
The sources of the Sileti are near Bozaigyr village in the Kazakh Uplands. It flows roughly northeastwards in its upper and middle course. As it reaches its last stretch the river divides into branches and bends northwards to the west of lake Zhalauly. In periods of adequate rainfall the river flows into the endorheic lake Siletiteniz from its southern end, but in dry years it doesn't reach the lake.

The main tributaries of the Sileti are Koyandy, Akzhar, Zhartas, Kedey, Sholakkarasu and Shili. The water is used for drinking, industrial and agricultural purposes. The river is frozen between late October or mid November until late March or early April. In some stretches it freezes to the bottom.

See also
List of rivers of Kazakhstan

References

External links

Rivers of Kazakhstan
West Siberian Plain
Endorheic basins of Asia